Eccles railway station serves the town of Eccles, Greater Manchester, England. It was opened on 15 September 1830 by the Liverpool and Manchester Railway (L&M).

Location
The station is next to the M602 motorway and is 300 metres north of Eccles Interchange, a bus and Metrolink interchange. A short freight-only branch line diverges from the main line here, which descends into the Manchester Ship Canal docks at Salford Quays to serve a Blue Circle cement terminal. The old slow line platforms can just be made out, though they are fenced off and heavily overgrown (the lines themselves were mostly lifted in the early 1970s, apart from the docks branch). The substantial street-level buildings built by the London & North Western Railway were also demolished in 1971, after being seriously damaged by fire.

Facilities
The station is staffed part-time, with a small ticket office (rebuilt in the summer of 2013) at street level.  The ticket office is open in the morning and early afternoon six days per week (06:25 to 12:55 weekdays, 07:25 to 13:55 Saturdays, closed Sundays). A ticket machine is available outside these times and for collecting pre-paid tickets.  There are basic shelters, digital information screens and timetable poster boards on each platform, along with a P.A system to provide automated train running announcements (the information screens, CCTV cameras & P.A. speakers were installed in September 2015).  Step-free access is not possible to either platform, as they can only reached by staircases from the road above.

Services

Monday to Saturdays there is generally an hourly service from Eccles to  via Manchester Piccadilly and  eastbound and Liverpool Lime Street westbound. Extra trains run at peak periods, with a handful of services to/from Manchester Victoria.

The station used to be served by North Wales services in the morning peak but this has now ceased.  However, with the creation of the MediaCityUK complex in Salford Quays, a much more frequent pattern of services stopping at Eccles has now been reviewed.

See also 
Eccles rail crash (1941) at the east end of the station in which 23 people were killed.
Eccles rail crash (1984)

References

External links 

Since 2005 the Friends of Eccles Station (FRECCLES) have adopted the station to help improve the environment and lobby for better passenger services.
For a brief video history about the station 

 

Railway stations in Salford
DfT Category E stations
Former London and North Western Railway stations
Railway stations in Great Britain opened in 1830
Northern franchise railway stations
1830 establishments in England
Eccles, Greater Manchester